The 2018 Lafayette Leopards football team represented Lafayette College in the 2018 NCAA Division I FCS football season. The Leopards were led by second-year head coach John Garrett and played their home games at Fisher Stadium. They were a member of the Patriot League. They finished the season 3–8, 2–4 in Patriot League play to finish in a three-way tie for fourth place.

Previous season
The Leopards finished the 2017 season 3–8, 3–3 in Patriot League play to finish in a three-way tie for third place.

Preseason

Preseason coaches poll
The Patriot League released their preseason coaches poll on July 26, 2018, with the Leopards predicted to finish in a tie for fifth place.

Preseason All-Patriot League team
The Leopards placed four players on the preseason all-Patriot League team.

Offense

Will Eisler – FB

Defense

Anthony Giudice – DL

Jerry Powe – LB

Special teams

CJ Amill – RS

Schedule

Game summaries

at Sacred Heart

at Delaware

Monmouth

at Colgate

Central Connecticut

Georgetown

at Bucknell

at Fordham

Holy Cross

at Army

Lehigh

References

Lafayette
Lafayette Leopards football seasons
Lafayette Leopards football